Eichenau is a municipality in the district of Fürstenfeldbruck, in Bavaria, Germany. It is 20 km west of Munich (centre).

Eichenau was officially named in 1907 as a separate settlement to the community of Alling. Its location is due to the railway station on the line Munich to Lindau. The settlement grew according to plans made by district commissioner Josef Nibler in Fürstenfeldbruck since 1916.  He founded the Baugenossenschaft Eichenau and managed to acquire 60 ha of land for housing projects after the First World War.
Most of the population commutes to Munich. The town now has a large sports centre, complete with outdoor beach volleyball courts and tennis courts.

Eichenau has two elementary schools ("Grundschule") and one high school ("Mittelschule").

Twin towns 
 Budrio, Italy, since 1990.
 Vyshhorod, Ukraine, since 1994.

Satellite Images 

http://www.wikimapia.org/#lat=48.&lon=11.&z=14&l=5&m=a&v=2

Famous people 
George Bouzianis (1885–1959), Greek painter
Georg Spillner (1908–1998), clown Nuk
Claus Biederstaedt (born 1928), German actor
Herbert Riehl-Heyse (1940–2003), German journalist und author
Alma Hagenbucher (born 1922), German businesswoman
Hejo Busley (born 1930), German historian
Claus Jürgen Diederichs (born 1941), German engineer
Josef Dering (1910–1999], German artist
Josefine Frühschütz ( unbek.–1998), midwife
Helmut Gneuss, (born 1927), German anglicist
Roland Helmer (born 1940), German painter
Widukind Lenz (1919–1995), German scientist
Zoltán Jókay (born 1960) Fotokünstler
Martin Kälberer (born 1968), German musician
Heiner Link (1960–2002), German writer.
Georg Metzger (born 1946), German footballer
Josef Nibler ( 1912 – unbek.), German civil servant, founder of Eichenau
Alfons Reckermann (born 1947), German philosopher
Ingrid Redlich-Pfund (born 1947) German painter
Franz Leonhardt Schadt (1910–2009), Germanpuppet player
Helmut Rehder (born 1927), German biologist und philosopher
Inge Seeliger (born 1930), German potter
Werner Stückmann (born 1926), German singer
Uta Titze-Stecher (born 1942), German politician MdB
Georg Maximilian Trenz (born 1962) German artist
Bennsi (born 2005), der unsichtbare
Passiwildie (born 2005), der vom Glück verlassene

Literature 
Hejo Busley, Angelika Schuster-Fox, Michael Gumtau (Hrsg.): Geschichte im Schatten einer Großstadt. Eichenau 1907–2007. Herbert Utz Verlag, München 2007,  (ISBN ) bzw.  (ISBN )
Landratsamt Fürstenfeldbruck: Der Landkreis Fürstenfeldbruck – Natur, Geschichte, Kultur, Fürstenfeldbruck 1992

References

External links 
http://eichenau.de official webpage
http://www.myheimat.de/fuerstenfeldbruck/beitrag/26518/rundgang-durch-eichenau-in-30-schritten-und-ein-video-versuch/ virtual tour of the town
 :de:Eichenau

Fürstenfeldbruck (district)